Northern Sunrise County is a municipal district in northern Alberta, Canada. Located in Census Division 17, its municipal office is located east of the Town of Peace River at the intersection of Highway 2 and Highway 688.

History 
On July 10, 2002, the name changed from Municipal District of East Peace No. 131 to Northern Sunrise County.

Geography

Communities and localities 
 
The following urban municipalities are surrounded by Northern Sunrise County.
Cities
none
Towns
none
Villages
Nampa
Summer villages
none

The following hamlets are located within Northern Sunrise County.
Hamlets
Cadotte Lake
Little Buffalo
Marie Reine
Reno
St. Isidore

The following localities are located within Northern Sunrise County.
Localities 
Atikamisis Lake Settlement
Bison Lake
Cardinal Point
Harmon Valley
Judah
L'Hirondelle
Lubicon Lake
Marten River
Martin River
Martin River Subdivision
Simon Lakes
Springburn
Three Creeks
Wabasca Settlement
Wabiskaw Settlement
Wesley Creek

Demographics 

In the 2016 Census of Population conducted by Statistics Canada, Northern Sunrise County had a population of 1,891 living in 712 of its 798 total private dwellings, a  change from its 2011 population of 1,791.

Northern Sunrise County's 2013 municipal census counted a population of 1,933, a  change from its 2011 municipal census population of 2,133. A shadow population count also occurred at the same time as its 2013 municipal census, which counted an additional non-permanent population of 592 for a combined 2013 population of 2,525.

Government 
Northern Sunrise County has six councilors, one for each of the following wards:
Ward 1 - Reno / Harmon Valley
Ward 2 - Nampa
Ward 3 - Marie Reine / Judah
Ward 4 - St. Isidore
Ward 5 - Three Creeks / Wesley Creek
Ward 6 - Cadotte Lake / Little Buffalo
The reeve is appointed from among the elected councilors.

See also 
List of communities in Alberta
List of municipal districts in Alberta

References

External links 

 
Municipal districts in Alberta